Lyachkanova is a rural locality (a village) in Yorgvinskoye Rural Settlement, Kudymkarsky District, Perm Krai, Russia. The population was 17 as of 2010.

Geography 
Lyachkanova is located 19 km northeast of Kudymkar (the district's administrative centre) by road. Rodeva is the nearest rural locality.

References 

Rural localities in Kudymkarsky District